Nathan Haseleu (born November 24, 1977; pronounced HAWS-lie) is a racecar driver from Sun Prairie, Wisconsin. His career peaked in the NASCAR Craftsman Truck Series with four Top 10 finishes for Roush Racing. Haseleu has also competed in the ASA Midwest Tour, the CRA Super Series, and the Wisconsin Challenge Series. He lives in Marshall, Dane County, Wisconsin.

Racing career
Haseleu began racing in a hobby stock at age 16 in 1994 at Columbus 151 Speedway and Jefferson Speedway in Wisconsin, and he won the Rookie of the Year at both tracks plus the championship at Columbus 151. He won hobby stock track championships both tracks in 1995. Haseleu moved up to the (limited) late model division at Columbus 151 Speedway in 1996. He was the division Rookie of the Year, finished third in points, and won the Hard Charger of the Year award for passing the most cars in feature races. He won the track late model championship in 1997 and repeated as Hard Charger. He started traveling in 1998. He won his first super late model race at Madison International Speedway in his second super late model start. He also competed in four NASCAR RE/MAX Challenge Series races. In 1999 had seven Top 10 finishes in the RE/MAX Challenge Series, one pole, and two Top 5 finishes. Also in 1999 he won the Miller Classic race at Madison, and 6 super late model features at Dells Motor Speedway (now Dells Raceway Park). He competed in 17 super late model races in 2000, with nine wins and thirteen Top 5 finishes. He also had one win, one pole, seven Top 5, and ten Top 10 finishes in the NASCAR Midwest Series (as the RE/MAX Challenge Series had been renamed).

He competed in twelve races in the NASCAR Craftsman Truck Series in 2001 for Roush Racing. He scored four Top 10 finishes before he was released halfway through the season due to poor performance. All four Top 10 finishes were tenth-place finishes. He finished 24th in the final series points.

He returned to racing at Wisconsin short tracks. He competed in 33 super late model races in 2002, and won 9 events. Three of the wins were in the Midwest All-Star Racing Series, and he finished second in the season points standings. Haseleu won two races at Madison in 2003, and had one win in ten starts at Madison in 2004. He was the 2005 champion of the Wisconsin Challenge Series with three wins. He also won five super late model features at Madison, and finished second in the season points despite missing two events. He won the 2005 Slinger Nationals at Slinger Super Speedway against numerous drivers with NASCAR experience. He won four straight races en route to winning the 2006 Wisconsin Challenge Series, including the series' events at the Milwaukee Mile and Wisconsin International Raceway. In 2007 he competed in the ASA Midwest Tour, the CRA Super Series, the Wisconsin Challenge Series (WCS), and occasional late model events. He won WCS races at Madison and Dells Raceway Park, and an ASA Midwest Tour race at Jefferson Speedway. He won the 2007 Wisconsin Challenge Series. He raced in the ASA Midwest Tour in 2008, finishing 8th in season points. In 14 events, he had eight Top 10 finishes and three Top 5s.

Haseleu has continued racing at Midwestern United States races, especially Wisconsin. He won the Oktoberfest 100 race at La Crosse Fairgrounds Speedway in 2013. Haseleu cut back to selected events in 2015 saying after an August win in the TUNDRA Super Late Model series at Golden Sands Speedway that he might stop racing after the season ends.

Motorsports career results

NASCAR
(key) (Bold – Pole position awarded by qualifying time. Italics – Pole position earned by points standings or practice time. * – Most laps led.)

Craftsman Truck Series

References

External links

 
 Wisconsin Challenge Series

Living people
1977 births
People from Sun Prairie, Wisconsin
Racing drivers from Wisconsin
NASCAR drivers
ARCA Midwest Tour drivers
People from Marshall, Dane County, Wisconsin
RFK Racing drivers